Madura Football Club is an Indonesia football club based in Sumenep, East Java. After relegation, the club will compete in Liga 3 in 2020. Madura FC plays their home matches in the Ahmad Yani Stadium. Their nickname is Laskar Jokotole (Jokotole Warriors) and Sapi Madura (Madura Cows).

History 
Madura FC was founded as Persebo Bondowoso on 1970. They managed to get promoted to the Liga Indonesia Second Division in 2010 after beating PSIK Klaten 3–1. In 2012, they won promotion to the Liga Indonesia Premier Division. When their facing Indonesia Soccer Championship B in 2016, Persebo move their homebase - to the Serasan Sekate Stadium in the Musi Banyuasin, South Sumatra. Because Semeru Stadium less qualified. Consequently, by playing in Sumatra, Persebo too Groups 1 after previously placed in Group 2. Persebo exchanged with PS Bengkulu. Persebo change their name to Persebo Musi Raya after move to Musi Banyuasin. At the late March 2017, Persebo Musi Raya change their name to Madura FC after move their homebase to Sumenep, East Java.

Stadium 
Madura FC will use Ahmad Yani Stadium (groundshare with Perssu Sumenep) at Liga 2.

References

External links 
 Persebo Bondowoso at Liga Indonesia 
 

Football clubs in Indonesia
Football clubs in East Java
Association football clubs established in 2017
2017 establishments in Indonesia